Hilal-ur-Rehman is a Pakistani politician who has been a member of Senate of Pakistan, since March 2012.

Political career
He was elected to the Senate of Pakistan as an independent candidate in 2012 Pakistani Senate election.

He was re-elected to the Senate as an independent candidate on general seat from FATA in 2018 Pakistani Senate election.

References

Living people
Pakistani senators (14th Parliament)
Year of birth missing (living people)